The 2009 Co-operative Championship is a semi-professional rugby league football competition played in the United Kingdom and France one tier below the first tier Super League. The two worst performing teams during the season, with the exception of Toulouse Olympique, will be relegated to Championship 1.

There is no automatic promotion from this league to Super League, which uses a licensing system renewed every three years. Qualifying for the Grand Final is a prerequisite for Championship clubs to be able to apply for license in the next round of applications for the 2012–14 period.

The competition was very close with most teams having a chance of making the top 6 going into the final round. In the end Barrow Raiders topped the standings followed by Halifax. The Leigh Centurions were relegated on the final day of competition despite finishing only third to last and Doncaster were also relegated but their fate had been sealed for some time. In the weeks following the competitions completion, Gateshead Thunder were eliminated following salary cap breaches and subsequently relegated to the Championship 1 for 2010, Leigh Centurions were therefore reprieved from relegation and remained in the Championship for 2010.

In the playoffs, Widnes Vikings and Featherstone Rovers advance from the first week to play each other. Featherstone won this game which gave them the chance to take on Halifax, who lost their game to Barrow, for a spot in the grand final. Halifax won and went on to play Barrow in the final but lost 26-18.

Table

Play-offs

The Co-operative Championship uses a top 6 play-off system.

Grand Final

Attendances 

Rugby League Crowds - 2009 Co-operative Champs

See also
 Co-operative Championship
 2009 Championship 1
 British rugby league system
 Super League
 Rugby League Conference
 Northern Ford Premiership
 National League Cup
 Rugby League Reserve Team Championship

Team season articles
 2009 Widnes Vikings season
 2009 Toulouse Olympique season
 2009 Whitehaven RLFC season
 2009 Featherstone Rovers season
 2009 Barrow Raiders season

External links
 Official Championship website
 RFL Championship coverage
 Scores from Sky Sports
 RugbyLeague.org Championship Fans Forums

Co-operative Championship
Co-operative Championship
Rugby Football League Championship

fr:Championship (rugby)
it:Co-operative Championship